The Ashgabat Trauma Center is a large orthopedic center in the south-western part of Ashgabat, the capital of Turkmenistan.  It opened on July 21, 2011, and is a 10-story white marble building.  It is the training base for the Faculty of Military Surgery and Traumatology of the Turkmen State Medical University and the city of Ashgabat Indira Gandhi Medical College.

References 

Hospital buildings completed in 2011
Hospitals in Turkmenistan
Buildings and structures in Ashgabat